The 30th Reconnaissance Squadron (30 RS) is a reconnaissance test squadron assigned to the 432nd Operations Group, 432nd Wing at Creech Air Force Base, Nevada. The 30 RS flies the RQ-170 Sentinel UAV out of the Tonopah Test Range Airport in Tonopah.

The squadron was previously assigned to the 57th Operations Group, 57th Wing, at Nellis Air Force Base, Nevada.

Operations 
Activated on 1 September 2005, at Tonopah Test Range Airport; and on 17 July 2007 it was assigned a new patch: the patch displays a black bird standing astride Asia and East Africa.

In 2010 a detachment with RQ-170 Sentinels was sent to Al Dhafra Air Base in order to spy on the nuclear program of Iran.

History 
Established on 1 May 1943 as a Photographic Reconnaissance Squadron, initially trained under Second Air Force in Colorado; reassigned to Third Air Force in Oklahoma where the squadron received P-38E/F-4 Lightning reconnaissance aircraft.

Deployed to the European Theater of Operations (ETO) in England, being assigned to Ninth Air Force. Initially stationed at the Royal Air Force reconnaissance training school at RAF Chalgrove, later moved to RAF Middle Wallop where the squadron became operational in the ETO. The squadron arrived in Chalgrove in late February 1944 and began operations in March. Engaged in unarmed and extremely hazardous combat operations over Occupied Europe, mapping  of the Netherlands and flew bomb-damage assessment missions over marshalling yards and gun emplacements in Belgium, the Netherlands, and France, in April 1944.

Earned DUC for participation with 10th Photographic Group, 7–20 May 1944, in photo reconnaissance of Utah beach for Normandy invasion. The citation read, in part: "Employing specially modified equipment installed in unarmed P-38 type aircraft, the intrepid pilots of the 10th Photographic Reconnaissance Group undertook the most hazardous missions. Flying unarmed and unescorted and at altitudes as low as twenty-five feet, they fearlessly piloted their aircraft over the difficult photographic runs in the face of intense fire from some of the strongest anti-aircraft installations in western Europe." Dicing, was the term used when referring to these extremely low-altitude flights over Utah Beach.

Flew sorties over France on D-Day making visual and photographic reconnaissance of bridges, artillery, road and rail junctions, traffic centers, airfields, and other targets. Moved into liberated area of France in early July, flying weather missions, made visual reconnaissance for ground forces, and photographed enemy positions to assist the First and Third Armies; Twelfth Army Group, and other Allied forces in the drive to Germany. Flew its first mission over Germany on 24 August 1944. Took part in the offensive against the Siegfried Line, Sep–Dec 1944, and in the Battle of the Bulge (Ardennes-Alsace), Dec 1944 – Jan 1945.

From then until the close of the war in Europe, the squadron photographed dams and bridges on the Roer River in preparation for the ground offensive to cross the river, and aided the Allied assault across the Rhine River and into Germany. Flew its 2,000th operational mission on 22 March 1945. Flew missions to Berlin on 8 April and to Dresden on 10 April 1945. Returned to the United States in July 1945, being assigned to Third Air Force, Continental Air Command at Drew Field, Florida. Squadron demobilized without becoming fully operational during the fall of 1945, inactivating on 7 November.

Re-established at Newark Army Air Base, New Jersey in 1947 as a Tenth Air Force Air Force Reserve corollary unit under the guidance of active duty units at McGuire AFB in order to train and maintain currency in reconnaissance operations for its reserve personnel. Primarily operated F-6 (later RF-51D Mustangs). Moved to McGuire AFB from Newark in 1949 when consolidated due to budget restrictions. Was brought to active service in 1951 due to manpower needs during the Korean War, personnel and aircraft being reassigned as fillers to various active-duty units. Inactivated as a paper unit in May 1951.

Reactivated under Tactical Air Command at Shaw AFB, South Carolina on 1 January 1953.  Performed training of photo-reconnaissance pilots with RB-26B Invader aircraft. Deployed to NATO in July 1953, being assigned to the United States Air Forces in Europe at Sembach AB, West Germany; its host 66th Tactical Reconnaissance Wing being the initial unit based at the new air base. Trained in night reconnaissance with RB-26s; replaced with RB-57A Canberra jet aircraft in 1955. Was reassigned to the 10th Tactical Reconnaissance Wing at Spangdahlem AB in 1958 as part of a USAFE reorganization. Upgraded to RB-66C Destroyers and continued night reconnaissance training. Moved to England in 1959 when Spangdahlem became a Tactical Fighter base. Operated from RAF Alconbury, however rotated frequently to Toul-Rosieres AB, France where the 10th TRW operated a forward detachment until 1965.

Re-equipped with the RF-4C Phantom II reconnaissance aircraft in 1966; operated the day/night capable Phantom for 10 years until 1976 when inactivated due to budget reductions and the need for tactical reconnaissance aircraft was reduced to the increasing use of space reconnaissance assets.

Reactivated in 2005 and equipped with unmanned reconnaissance aircraft.

Lineage 
 Constituted 30th Photographic Reconnaissance Squadron on 5 February 1943.
 Redesignated 30th Photographic Squadron (Light) on 6 February 1943.
 Activated on 1 May 1943.
 Redesignated 30th Photo Reconnaissance Squadron on 11 August 1943.
 Inactivated on 7 November 1945.
 Redesignated 30th Reconnaissance Squadron, Photo, on 11 March 1947.
 Activated in the Reserve on 25 July 1947.
 Redesignated 30th Strategic Reconnaissance Squadron, Electronics, on 27 June 1949.
 Ordered to Active Service on 1 May 1951.
 Inactivated on 16 May 1951.
 Redesignated 30th Tactical Reconnaissance Squadron, Night-Photo, on 15 November 1952.
 Activated on 1 January 1953.
 Redesignated: 30th Tactical Reconnaissance Squadron, Night Photo-Jet, on 8 January 1957.
 Redesignated: 30th Tactical Reconnaissance Squadron on 1 October 1966.
 Inactivated on 1 April 1976.
 Redesignated 30th Reconnaissance Squadron on 17 June 2005.
 Activated on 1 September 2005.

Assignments 
 7th Photographic (later, Photographic Reconnaissance and Mapping) Group, 1 May 1943
 Third Air Force, 21 June 1943
 III Reconnaissance Command, 12 October 1943
 Ninth Air Force, 4 February 1944
 10th Photographic Group, 21 February 1944
 Attached to 67th Tactical Reconnaissance Group after 9 June 1944
 67th Tactical Reconnaissance (later, Reconnaissance) Group, 13 June 1944 – 7 November 1945
 66th Reconnaissance (later, Strategic Reconnaissance) Group, 25 July 1947 – 16 May 1951
 66th Tactical Reconnaissance Group, 1 January 1953
 66th Tactical Reconnaissance Wing, 8 December 1957
 Attached to 10th Tactical Reconnaissance Wing from 8 January 1958
 10th Tactical Reconnaissance Wing, 8 March 1958 – 1 April 1976
 57th Operations Group, 1 September 2005
 432d Operations Group, 1 May 2007 – present

Stations 

 Peterson Field, Colorado, 1 May 1943
 Will Rogers Field, Oklahoma, 10 October 1943
 Camp Kilmer, New Jersey, 3–17 Jan 1944
 RAF Chalgrove (AAF-465), England, 1 February 1944
 RAF Middle Wallop (AAF-449), England, 17 May 1944
 Le Molay Airfield (A-9), France, 3 July 1944
 Toussus Le Noble Airfield (A-46), France, 31 August 1944
 Charleroi-Gosselies Airfield (A-87), Belgium, 22 September 1944
 Operated from Florennes Juzaine Airfield (A-78), Belgium, 8–18 Dec 1944
 Vogelsang Airfield (Y-51), Germany, 24 March 1945
 Limburg Airfield (Y-83), Germany, 2 April 1945

 Eschwege Airfield (R-11), Germany, 11 Apr – Jul 1945
 Drew Field, Florida, 20 Sep – 7 November 1945
 Newark Army Air Base, New Jersey, 25 July 1947
 McGuire AFB, New Jersey, 27 June 1949
 Barksdale AFB, Louisiana, 10 October 1949 – 16 May 1951
 Shaw AFB, South Carolina, 1 January 1953
 Sembach AB, West Germany, 8 July 1953
 Spangdahlem AB, West Germany, 8 January 1958
 RAF Alconbury, England, 25 August 1959 – 1 April 1976
 Operated from Moron AB, Spain, 9 May-10 Jun 1968)
 Tonopah Test Range Airport, Nevada, 1 September 2005 – 30 June 2012
 Creech AFB, Nevada, 1 July 2012 – Present

Aircraft 
 P-38E/F-4 Lightning, 1943
 P-38G/F-5 Lightning, 1943–1945
 F-6 (later RF-51D) Mustang, 1947–1951
 RB-26B Invader, 1953–1955
 B/RB-57A Canberra, 1955–1957
 RB-66C Destroyer, 1957–1965
 RF-4C Phantom II, 1965–1976
 RQ-170 Sentinel, 2005–present

References

External links 

 Air Force Historical Research Agency: 30th Reconnaissance Squadron (ACC)

Military units and formations in Nevada
030